The Grand Mall Ajman is a shopping mall and apartment complex in the emirate of Ajman, United Arab Emirates (UAE), which is owned and operated by the Government of the Ajman Emirate.

Location
It is located on Sheikh Khalifa Bin Zayed St in Ajman.

Shopping, entertainment, and living
With 409 apartments, 163 commercial offices and 90 shops, as well as restaurants, a hospital and a multi-level movie theatre, it is a multifaceted luxury mall which even got a visit from local Emirate President and Emirati Supreme Council leader Humaid bin Rashid Al Nuaimi III. The mall has Star Cinemas Now, Madeena Medical Centre, a branch of Dubai Islamic Bank, Tim Horton's, the Grand Residence Tower, the Federal Electricity & Water Authority, a kids playing area, and a fitness club. There also are green lights located on the street around the mall that have the former ruler Sheikh Zayed's image inside them.

Use as a COVID and medical testing center for the government
In 2019, the Emirati Government set up a temporary testing center in multiple malls and store outlets throughout the Emirates with the Grand Mall being used as the primary location for citizens in Ajman. The Prime Medical Clinic was the sponsor.

In 2020 and 2021, additional testing for governmental events and COVID testing occurred there through the same Prime Medical Clinic.

References

1998 establishments in the United Arab Emirates
Shopping malls established in 2020
Shopping malls in the United Arab Emirates
Buildings and structures in the Emirate of Ajman
Economy of the Emirate of Ajman